Joaquín Alonso Ventura (born 27 October 1956) is a retired Salvadoran football player.

Club career
Nicknamed La Muerte (The death), Ventura played for Salvadoran sides Santiagueño and Águila, with whom he won the 1976 CONCACAF Champions' Cup.

International career
Ventura has represented his country in 4 FIFA World Cup qualification matches and played in all of their games at the 1982 World Cup in Spain.

Retirement
After retiring Ventura became a fitness instructor and English teacher.

References

External links
 La historia de la clasificacion a la Copa Mundo 1982  - El Balón Cuscatleco 

1956 births
Living people
Association football midfielders
Salvadoran footballers
El Salvador international footballers
1982 FIFA World Cup players
C.D. Águila footballers